Roger C. Schultz (born October 13, 1945) is a retired United States Army lieutenant general who served as director of the Army National Guard.

Early life
Roger Charles Schultz was born in Le Mars, Iowa on October 13, 1945.  He graduated from LeMars Community School in 1963 and enlisted in the Iowa Army National Guard.  He received his commission as a Second Lieutenant of Infantry upon graduation from Officer Candidate School in 1967.

Schultz is a licensed airplane pilot (Commercial and Multi-Engine Land Instrument Rating).

Vietnam war
In 1968, Schultz was called to active duty as a member of the Iowa National Guard's 2nd Battalion, 133rd Infantry.  After training at Fort Carson, Colorado, he served in Vietnam with 2nd Battalion, 22nd Infantry Regiment in 1969, first as a rifle platoon leader, and later as a scout platoon leader.  Schultz received the Silver Star for heroism in combat, as well as the Combat Infantryman Badge, Purple Heart (two awards), Vietnam Service Medal (with 3 Bronze Stars), Republic of Vietnam Gallantry Cross (with Gold and Silver Star), Republic of Vietnam Campaign Medal (with "60" Device), Republic of Vietnam Gallantry Cross (with Palm Unit Citation), and Republic of Vietnam Civil Actions Unit Citation.

Education
Schultz is a graduate of the Infantry Officer Basic and Advanced Courses, and the United States Army Command and General Staff College.

He received a Bachelor of Science degree in Management from Upper Iowa University in 1980.  In 1992 he graduated from the United States Army War College and received a Master of Public Administration degree from Shippensburg State University.

Post Vietnam war
Schultz continued his military service after the Vietnam War, serving in a variety of command and staff positions in Iowa.  His assignments included: Commander, Company B, 2nd Battalion, 133rd Infantry (1975-1976); commander, 1st Battalion, 168th Infantry (1982-1984); chief of staff, Iowa Army National Guard (1988-1991); commander, 2nd Brigade, 34th Infantry Division (1992-1995); and Deputy Adjutant General, Iowa National Guard (1995-1998).  While serving as Deputy Adjutant General, Schultz was also assigned as Deputy Director of the Army's Directorate for Mobilization Support, part of an effort by Secretary of Defense William Cohen to better integrate the Reserve and Active components of the military for fighting domestic terrorism.

Director, Army National Guard
In 1998, Schultz was appointed director of the Army National Guard as a major general.

In 2001, Congress passed legislation upgrading the positions in charge of the Reserve components, including Director of the Army National Guard and Director of the Air National Guard, and Schultz was promoted to lieutenant general.

Schultz served as director of the Army National Guard until retiring in 2005.  he was succeeded by Clyde A. Vaughn.

Post military career
After retiring from the military, Schultz was named Vice President of Unitech, a company which provided homeland security and military training and simulation products and services to government and the military.  Unitech was later purchased by Lockheed Martin, and Schultz became a program Management Director.

In 2011, Schultz became Senior Vice President and Chief Operating Officer of SENTEL Corporation, which provides technology development and testing services to the military and government agencies.

Schultz was also a member of the Board of Directors of 5Star Life Insurance Company and the Armed Forces Benefit Association.  In addition, he served on the Association of the United States Army Council of Trustees.

In 2015 Schultz was named president of the Army Historical Foundation, the fundraising entity of the National Museum of the United States Army.

Awards and decorations

Additional awards
In 2006 Schultz was the commencement speaker at Morningside College and received an honorary Doctor of Laws degree.

Effective dates of promotions
Second lieutenant, Army National Guard, June 26, 1967
Second Lieutenant, Army of the United States, August 21, 1968
First lieutenant, Army of the United States, April 1, 1969
First lieutenant, Army National Guard, June 25, 1969
Captain, Army National Guard, May 17, 1971
Major, Army National Guard, March 31, 1976
Lieutenant colonel, Army National Guard, February 10, 1981
Colonel, Army National Guard, February 1, 1985
Brigadier general, Army National Guard, May 21, 1996
Major general, Army National Guard, June 1, 1998
Lieutenant general, May 24, 2001

References

External resources
Roger C. Schultz at National Guard Bureau General Officer Management Office

Living people
1945 births
People from Le Mars, Iowa
Upper Iowa University alumni
Shippensburg University of Pennsylvania alumni
United States Army Command and General Staff College alumni
United States Army War College alumni
United States Army personnel of the Vietnam War
Recipients of the Distinguished Service Medal (US Army)
Recipients of the Silver Star
Recipients of the Legion of Merit
United States Army generals
National Guard (United States) generals
Recipients of the Meritorious Service Medal (United States)
Military personnel from Iowa